Wayne Jones may refer to:

Wayne Jones (darts player) (born 1965), English darts player
Wayne Jones (footballer) (born 1948), Welsh footballer
Wayne Jones (snooker player) (born 1959), Welsh snooker player
Wayne Jones (politician), former member of the Ohio House of Representatives